Maria Elizabeth Gough is an art historian and Actor. She serves as Joseph Pulitzer, Jr. Professor of Modern Art at Harvard University. Her research focuses on early twentieth-century European art, particularly the Russian avant-gardes, Weimar, and French modernism.

Life
Gough graduated from  University of Melbourne (BA Hons, 1987), Johns Hopkins University (MA, 1991), and Harvard University (PhD, 1997). Prior to joining Harvard, she taught at University of Michigan (1996-2003) and Stanford University (2003-2009). 

In 1991, Gough was part of an Oxford University Press video series designed to teach English to children, playing the title character Wizadora. (The role was recast when ITV picked up the series.)

Works
 
 

 

Anna Vallye (ed), Léger: Modern Art and the Metropolis Yale University Press, 2013,

See also
 Aleksandr Drevin
 Karlis Johansons
 Konrāds Ubāns
 Tensegrity

References

Living people
Year of birth missing (living people)
Women art historians
University of Michigan faculty
University of Melbourne alumni
Johns Hopkins University alumni
Harvard University alumni
Harvard University faculty